Kuran is a surname. Notable people with the surname include:

Aptullah Kuran (1927–2002), Turkish architectural historian
Juraj Kuráň (born 1988), Slovak footballer
Timur Kuran (born 1954), Turkish American economist

See also
Kuroń